Oglethorpe County is a county located in the northeastern part of the U.S. state of Georgia. As of the 2020 census, the population was 14,825. The county seat is Lexington.

Oglethorpe County is included in the Athens-Clarke County, GA Metropolitan Statistical Area, which is also included in the Atlanta-Athens-Clarke County-Sandy Springs, GA Combined Statistical Area. It is the largest county in Northeast Georgia.

History
Oglethorpe County was originally part of a large tract of land surrendered by Creek and Cherokee Native Americans to the Colony of Georgia in the treaty of 1773.  The county itself was founded on December 19, 1793, and is named for Georgia's founder, General James Oglethorpe.

On September 10, 1919, Obe Cox was accused of murdering a White farmer's wife. He was seized by a White mob taken to the scene of the crime, his body riddled with bullets and burned at the stake. Several thousand persons witnessed the scene. The lynching was controversial as the local black community "thanked" the mob for just killing Cox and not attacking their community. After an investigation the black media of the time reported that the blacks who wrote the letter thanking the lynching "do not stand for much in the town and are excused for their utter ignorance in condoning [lynching]."

See reference "The Lynching Project:Oglethorpe County"

Geography
The county is located in the Piedmont region of the state.

The majority of Oglethorpe County is located in the Broad River sub-basin of the Savannah River basin.  A narrow western portion of the county, in a line from just north of Woodville, through Crawford, to just south of Winterville, is located in the Upper Oconee River sub-basin of the Altamaha River basin.  A small part of the southern portion of the county, from Maxeys east, is located in the Little River sub-basin of the Savannah River basin.

River
 Broad River

Adjacent counties
 Elbert County (northeast)
 Wilkes County (east)
 Taliaferro County (southeast)
 Greene County (south)
 Oconee County (west)
 Clarke County (west)
 Madison County (north)

National protected area
 Oconee National Forest (part)
 Watson Mill Bridge State Park (part)

Transportation

Major highways
  U.S. Route 78
  State Route 10
  State Route 22
  State Route 77

Pedestrians and cycling
The county has limited walkability options available.

Demographics

2000 census
As of the census of 2000, there were 12,635 people, 4,849 households, and 3,539 families living in the county.  The population density was 11/km2 (29/mi2).  There were 5,368 housing units at an average density of 5/km2 (12/mi2).  The racial makeup of the county was 78.29% White, 19.75% Black or African American, 0.20% Native American, 0.25% Asian, 0.04% Pacific Islander, 0.63% from other races, and 0.85% from two or more races.  1.38% of the population were Hispanic or Latino of any race.

There were 4,849 households, out of which 33.60% had children under the age of 18 living with them, 57.30% were married couples living together, 11.50% had a female householder with no husband present, and 27.00% were non-families. 23.00% of all households were made up of individuals, and 9.00% had someone living alone who was 65 years of age or older.  The average household size was 2.58 and the average family size was 3.05.

In the county, the population was spread out, with 25.80% under the age of 18, 7.80% from 18 to 24, 30.00% from 25 to 44, 24.00% from 45 to 64, and 12.40% who were 65 years of age or older.  The median age was 37 years. For every 100 females, there were 94.40 males.  For every 100 females age 18 and over, there were 92.30 males.

The median income for a household in the county was $35,578, and the median income for a family was $41,443. Males had a median income of $30,733 versus $22,289 for females. The per capita income for the county was $17,089.  About 10.00% of families and 13.20% of the population were below the poverty line, including 15.90% of those under age 18 and 18.40% of those age 65 or over.

2010 census
As of the 2010 United States Census, there were 14,899 people, 5,647 households, and 4,070 families living in the county. The racial makeup of the county was 78.3% White, 17.2% black or African American, 0.4% Asian, 0.2% American Indian, 1.9% from other races, and 1.9% from two or more races. Those of Hispanic or Latino origin made up 3.7% of the population. In terms of ancestry, 17.5% were American, 12.3% were Irish, 9.9% were German, and 8.2% were English.

Of the 5,647 households, 34.9% had children under the age of 18 living with them, 54.2% were married couples living together, 12.5% had a female householder with no husband present, 27.9% were non-families, and 23.3% of all households were made up of individuals. The average household size was 2.61 and the average family size was 3.07. The median age was 40.1 years.

The median income for a household in the county was $39,319 and the median income for a family was $52,955. Males had a median income of $35,966 versus $27,474 for females. The per capita income for the county was $17,572. About 11.6% of families and 19.0% of the population were below the poverty line, including 20.4% of those under age 18 and 15.6% of those age 65 or over.

2020 census

As of the 2020 United States Census, there were 14,825 people, 5,651 households, and 3,711 families residing in the county.

Education

Recreation
 White Water Rafting on the Broad and South Fork Broad Rivers
 ATV and Motor Bike Park
 Sportsman Hunting: Seasonal Whitetail Deer, Turkey and Rabbit
Historic Districts and Heritage Research,
Antique Stores in Historic Lexington,
Agriculture and Agritourism as well as Oglethorpe Fresh Produce

In 2016, the Oglethorpe County Recreation Department was named both the District 7 and State Agency of the Year for populations under 20,000 through the Georgia Recreation and Park Association.

Communities
 Arnoldsville
 Crawford
 Lexington
 Comer (partially in Madison County)
 Carlton (partially in Madison County)
 Maxeys
 Philomath
 Sandy Cross
 Stephens
 Vesta

Notable people
 Nathan Crawford Barnett, member of the Georgia House of Representatives and Georgia Secretary of State for more than 30 years. Raised in Lexington, and educated at the Lexington Academy
 William H. Crawford (1772–1834) - U.S. Minister to France, U.S. Secretary of War, and U.S. Secretary of the Treasury
 George R. Gilmer (1790–1859) - Twice Governor
 Meriwether Lewis (1774–1809) - leader of the Lewis and Clark Expedition
 Wilson Lumpkin (1783–1870) - Governor
 Joseph H. Lumpkin (1799–1867) First Chief Justice of the Georgia Supreme Court and co-founder of the Lumpkin Law School
 George Mathews (1739–1812) - Revolutionary hero and twice Governor
 Kenny Rogers - Country music performer

Politics

See also

 National Register of Historic Places listings in Oglethorpe County, Georgia
List of counties in Georgia

Bibliography
Notes

References
  - Total pages: 375

External links

 Oglethorpe County official website
 Watson Mill Covered Bridge State Park

 
Georgia (U.S. state) counties
Athens – Clarke County metropolitan area
1795 establishments in Georgia (U.S. state)
Populated places established in 1795